John Klenner (24 February 1899 – 13 August 1955) was a German-born American pianist and composer. He composed both classical and popular music and is best known for writing the song "Just Friends" with Sam M. Lewis in 1931.

Compositions 
Concertante
 Fantasia for viola and orchestra

Vocal
"Down the River of Golden Dreams" (1930)
"Heartaches" (1931)
"Just Friends" (1931)
"Round the Bend of the Road" (1932)
"Smoke Dreams" (1937)
"On the Street of Regret" (1942)

Notes

External links

1899 births
1955 deaths
American male composers
German emigrants to the United States
20th-century American composers
20th-century American male musicians